The following highways are numbered 64:

Australia
 Mid-Western Highway

Canada
 Alberta Highway 64
 Highway 64 (Ontario)

India
 National Highway 64

Iran
 Road 64

Korea, South
National Route 64

Philippines
 N64 highway (Philippines)

Taiwan
 Provincial Highway 64 (Taiwan)

United Kingdom
 A64 road running from Leeds to Scarborough

United States
 Interstate 64
 U.S. Route 64
 Alabama State Route 64
 Arizona State Route 64
 California State Route 64 (unbuilt)
 Colorado State Highway 64
 Connecticut Route 64
 Florida State Road 64
 County Road 64A (Hardee County, Florida)
 County Road 64 (Highlands County, Florida)
 County Road 64 (Polk County, Florida)
 Georgia State Route 64
 Hawaii Route 64
 Idaho State Highway 64
 Illinois Route 64
 Indiana State Road 64
 Iowa Highway 64
 K-64 (Kansas highway)
 Louisiana Highway 64
 Louisiana State Route 64 (former)
 Maryland Route 64
 Massachusetts Route 64 (former)
 M-64 (Michigan highway)
 Minnesota State Highway 64
 County Road 64 (Scott County, Minnesota)
 Missouri Route 64
 Missouri Route 64A
 Missouri Route 64B
 Montana Highway 64
 Nebraska Highway 64
 Nebraska Spur 64A
 Nebraska Spur 64B
 Nebraska Spur 64E
 Nebraska Spur 64G
 Nebraska Recreation Road 64F
 Nebraska Recreation Road 64H
 Nevada State Route 64 (former)
 New Jersey Route 64
 County Route 64 (Bergen County, New Jersey)
 New York State Route 64
 County Route 64 (Cattaraugus County, New York)
 County Route 64 (Chemung County, New York)
 County Route 64 (Dutchess County, New York)
 County Route 64 (Erie County, New York)
 County Route 64 (Jefferson County, New York)
 County Route 64 (Madison County, New York)
 County Route 64 (Montgomery County, New York)
 County Route 64 (Onondaga County, New York)
 County Route 64 (Putnam County, New York)
 County Route 64 (Rockland County, New York)
 County Route 64 (Saratoga County, New York)
 County Route 64 (Suffolk County, New York)
 County Route 64 (Warren County, New York)
 North Carolina Highway 64 (former)
 Ohio State Route 64
 Oklahoma State Highway 64A (former)
 Oklahoma State Highway 64B
 Oklahoma State Highway 64C (former)
 Oklahoma State Highway 64D
 Pennsylvania Route 64
 South Carolina Highway 64
 Tennessee State Route 64
 Texas State Highway 64
 Texas State Highway Loop 64 (former)
 Farm to Market Road 64
 Texas Park Road 64
 Utah State Route 64
 Vermont Route 64
 Virginia State Route 64 (former)
 Wisconsin Highway 64

Territories:
 Puerto Rico Highway 64
 U.S. Virgin Islands Highway 64

See also
A64 (disambiguation)